Court music may refer to various music styles associated with courts:
 Yayue, Chinese court music
 Gagaku, Japanese court music
 Korean court music
 Ottoman classical music, Turkish court music
 Nhã nhạc, Vietnamese court music